Cystiscus viaderi is a species of very small sea snail, a marine gastropod mollusk or micromollusk in the family Cystiscidae.

Description
The size of the shell attains 1.5 mm.

Distribution
This species occurs in the Indian Ocean off Mauritius.

References

Cystiscidae
Gastropods described in 2004
Viaderi